Forget it may refer to:

 "Forget It!", a 2001 Donald Duck comic by Don Rosa
 "Vergiß Es (Forget It)", 2004 Matthias Reim single with Bonnie Tyler on vocals
 "Forget It" (Barei song) 2017
 "Forget It", track on the 2004 Breaking Benjamin album We Are Not Alone

See also
Forget about it (disambiguation)